is a Japanese footballer currently playing as a midfielder for Ventforet Kofu on loan from Cerezo Osaka.

Career statistics

Club

Notes

Honours

Club
Ventforet Kofu
 Emperor's Cup: 2022

References

External links

2001 births
Living people
Japanese footballers
Japan youth international footballers
Association football midfielders
J3 League players
J2 League players
Cerezo Osaka players
Cerezo Osaka U-23 players
Tochigi SC players
Ventforet Kofu players